DWJY (94.3 FM) was a radio station owned and operated by Nation Broadcasting Corporation.

History
The station was established in 1982 as MRS 94.3, airing an adult contemporary format. In 1998, after NBC was acquired by PLDT subsidiary MediaQuest Holdings, the station rebranded as Lovely @ Rhythms 94.3 and switched to a Top 40 format. In 2005, the "Rhythms" tag was dropped. In 2009, it became a relay station of 92.3 in Manila until June 2012, when it went off the air due to frequency conflicts.

References

Radio stations in Laguna (province)
Radio stations established in 1982
Radio stations disestablished in 2012
Defunct radio stations in the Philippines